The Wasilla Depot was built in 1917 in Wasilla, Alaska.  It was designed and built by the Alaska Engineering Commission, a federal agency charged with building Alaska's railways.  The structure, located at the corner of Parks Highway and Main Street, was restored by the Lions Clubs and the Wasilla Chamber of Commerce.

The building was listed on the U.S. National Register of Historic Places in 1977.

References

Alaska Railroad stations
Railway stations on the National Register of Historic Places in Alaska
Railway stations in the United States opened in 1917
Wasilla, Alaska
Buildings and structures on the National Register of Historic Places in Matanuska-Susitna Borough, Alaska
1917 establishments in Alaska